Elisha Haley (January 21, 1776 – January 22, 1860) was a United States Representative from Connecticut. He was born in Groton in the Connecticut Colony where he attended the common schools. He engaged in agricultural pursuits.

Haley served in the Connecticut House of Representatives in 1820, 1824, 1826, 1829, 1833, and 1834. He was member of the Connecticut Senate in 1830 and also served as a captain in the Connecticut militia. He was elected as a Jacksonian to the Twenty-fourth Congress and reelected as a Democrat to the Twenty-fifth Congress (March 4, 1835 – March 3, 1839). In Congress, he served as chairman, Committee on Public Expenditures (Twenty-fifth Congress). After leaving Congress, he engaged in civil engineering. He died in Groton, Connecticut in 1860 and was buried in Crary Cemetery.

References

External links 

1776 births
1860 deaths
Democratic Party Connecticut state senators
Democratic Party members of the Connecticut House of Representatives
People from Groton, Connecticut
Democratic Party members of the United States House of Representatives from Connecticut
Jacksonian members of the United States House of Representatives from Connecticut
19th-century American politicians